Waiblingen station is a railway station in the city of Waiblingen in the German state of Baden-Württemberg. The station is located at the junction of the Rems Railway and the Murr Railway (Murrbahn).

History

The first station building 
The first station in Waiblingen was built in 1861 during the construction of the Rems Railway. This building still exists; it is about 200 m east of the present station and serves as a residence. Immediately east of it there was a level crossing of Mayenner Straße over the Rems Railway; this was replaced by an underpass at the end of the 1960s.

Second station building 

With the construction of the Murr Railway in 1876, the station had to be completely rebuilt at the junction of the lines as a Keilbahnhof ("wedge station"). The station building was located slightly east of the current station. It was a two-story building, similar in style to Winnenden station. It was demolished in preparation for the extension of the Stuttgart S-Bahn in 1979.

Third station building 
The current entrance building was opened in 1980 in preparation for the opening of S-Bahn lines S2 and S3 in 1981. This building no longer had direct access to the platforms; instead a busway with stops for city and regional bus services runs next to the platforms. Also, the station forecourt was reduced to provide a large park-and-ride space. Along with the entrance  buildings at Stuttgart-Zuffenhausen (opened in 1982) and Ludwigsburg (opened in 1992), it is one of only a few new station buildings that replaced an old station building in Württemberg once the reconstruction of damaged stations after World War II had been completed.

Its last major modernisation was carried out in early 2008, when the kiosk and restaurant facilities built in 1980 were replaced by a modern kiosk and a bakery. In 2009, the station was adapted for disabled access.

Station layout 
Waiblingen station includes the following platform tracks:
track 1: Murr line to Stuttgart
track 2: for freight/through traffic (cambered track)
track 3: Murr line to Schwäbisch Hall,
track 4: a former terminating track for suburban services to Stuttgart, closed in 1980
track 5: Rems line to Stuttgart,
track 6: Rems line to Stuttgart or Aalen (reversible)
track 7: Rems line to Aalen and through traffic. The platform between track 6 and track 7 is designed as an island platform.

Operations 
Waiblingen station is served by S-Bahn trains on lines S2 and S3 of the Stuttgart S-Bahn and Regional-Express trains on lines R2 and R3. Long-distance services generally do not stop in Waiblingen.

Regional services

S-Bahn

References

Stuttgart S-Bahn stations
Railway stations in Baden-Württemberg
Railway stations in Germany opened in 1861
19th-century establishments in Württemberg
Buildings and structures in Rems-Murr-Kreis